Brevibacillus borstelensis is a Gram-positive, aerobic, rod-shaped, endospore-forming bacterium of the genus Brevibacillus.  The genome of several B. borstelensis strains have been sequenced.

Brevibacillus borstelensis strain 707 is a thermophilic strain capable of degrading and using polyethylene as its sole source of carbon.  This strain was shown to reduce the amount of polyethylene by 30% (30 days at 50°C) and demonstrates that nondegradable plastics like polyethylene can be degraded under appropriate conditions.

References

Further reading

External links
Type strain of Brevibacillus borstelensis at BacDive -  the Bacterial Diversity Metadatabase

Paenibacillaceae
Thermophiles
Bacteria described in 1995